Sardunya (Geranium) is a 2021 film portraying the trials and tribulations of 19-year-old Defne as she spends time with her father in the country following his stroke. The film starring İlayda Elif Elhih as Defne and Ali Seçkiner Alıcı as her father was written and directed by Cagil Bocut; his first feature length film. It was nominated for and won several awards such as at the Istanbul International Film Festival.

Plot 
19-year-old Defne is University student in Istanbul. She receives a phone call during her driving exam and learns that her father had a stroke. This leads her to leave Istanbul and return to Urla to live with her father. Both see these difficult times a good opportunity to mend their relationship. Her sick aunt is staying in the same house with Defne and her father as well, which further complicates the situation at the home. Throughout the film, we witness Defne's relationship with her family and the difficulties of the situation that she is in.

Major cast

Awards and nominations 

The film also participated in the 2020-2021 Singapore International Film Festival that went from (26 November to 6 December), in the section for first-time and second-time Asian directors, along with 7 other films, and the 22nd International Frankfurt Turkish Film Festival where it won in the category of best cinematography. And the 2nd Izmir International Film and Music Festival.

Production team

References

Further reading

External links

Trailers
Box Office Türkiye 
MUBI 

2021 films
Turkish drama films
Films shot in Turkey